The Saint Cyr Range is a remote mountain range in the Yukon, Canada. It has an area of 6224 km2 and is a subrange of the Pelly Mountains which in turn form part of the Yukon Ranges.

See also
List of mountain ranges
Mount Atherton [105K/4]
 Rose Mountain [105K/5] 
 Mount Mye [105K/6]

References

Mountain ranges of Yukon